Matanga is a genus of moth in the family Geometridae.

References

Natural History Museum Lepidoptera genus database

Geometridae
Geometridae genera